Ingrid Bengis was born in 1944 in New York City and died of cancer in 2017 in Stonington, Maine.  She was a writer and a business woman.   She usually lived in Stonington, Maine, but also taught twentieth century American literature at the University of St. Petersburg, in St. Petersburg, Russia (where Alexander Pushkin and Vladimir Putin both studied). She was married to a Russian ballet dancer and has one daughter and one stepson.

Writer 
She is best known for her pioneering collection of essays on love, hate and sexuality, Combat in the Erogenous Zone, (Knopf 1972). The book received critical acclaim and was nominated for a National Book Award. The New York Times Book Review said, "It must be read and it must be taken seriously if human sexuality is ever going to live up to its notices" while Newsweek called it "a remarkable book...that has probably moved both women and men on a deeper level than any other document of the new feminism". It was reissued in 1990 after Martin Duberman, writing in The Village Voice asked, "Where is this astonishing writer? Why has she dropped from sight". The reissue by HarperCollins included a new introduction by Duberman, in which he wrote, "(Bengis) was only twenty eight when the book was published, but had lived so intensely and could describe her experiences so freshly...that her ruminations about love, hate and sex struck many of us who were older than she as astonishingly vivid and wise. Nearly twenty years later, they still do." Among the most frequently cited quotes from the book are "Imagination has always had powers of resurrection that no science can match" and "For me, words are a form of action, capable of influencing change", quoted by Barack Obama in one of his 2008 campaign speeches.

In 2003, Farrar, Straus & Giroux, North Point Press published Bengis' book Metro Stop Dostoyevsky: Travels in Russian Time which takes place in  Russia between 1990-1996 . Naively in love with Russia and Russian literature, she settled in St. Petersburg in 1990 as the Soviet Union was collapsing, and quickly became immersed in "catastroika", a period of immense turmoil that mirrored her own increasingly complex and contradictory experience.   Her friendship with a Russian woman whose  marriage is also falling apart, reflects the social tumult, as well as the sometimes dangerous consequences, of American good intentions. It was hailed by Kurt Vonnegut as "the most sane and intelligent book anyone could possibly write about what it is like to be an American or a Russian at the start of the new millennium," and Norman Mailer said "There is so much to praise about Metro Stop Dostoyevsky that I will content myself with but one remark. I read it all in something approaching whole pleasure, and how often can we make such a claim?"

She is also the author of a novel, I Have Come here to be Alone, Simon & Schuster, 1977 and  a contributor to many magazines and journals. Her work has been translated into six languages, most recently Russian, where her essay Home: Variations on a Theme appeared in the highly respected literary magazine Zvezda.

Business Woman 
Ingrid Bengis founded Ingrid Bengis Seafood in 1985 and owned and managed the establishment for 30 years.  She developed a special connection between the fishermen of Maine and the elite chefs of the United States.  Chefs with whom she worked included Thomas Keller, Jean-Georges Vongerichten, and Dan Barber.

Quotes by Ingrid Bengis
'Words are a form of action, capable of influencing change'

Bibliography
Combat in the Erogenous Zone:  Writings on Love, Hate, and Sex. Wildwood House, London, 1973, 
I Have Come Here to Be Alone, a novel
Metro Stop Dostoevsky:  Travels in Russian Time

References

External links
 Brief notice by publisher about Metro Stop Dostoevsky
 BBC News UK has a short article about Bengis and St. Petersburg

1944 births
Living people